Frommelt is a German surname that may refer to
Christof Frommelt (born 1918), Olympic cross-country skier from Liechtenstein
Louis Frommelt (1943–2005), Olympic sport shooter from Liechtenstein
Paul Frommelt (born 1957), Olympic alpine skier from Liechtenstein, son of Christof
Willi Frommelt (born 1952), Olympic alpine skier from Liechtenstein, son of Christof, brother of Paul

German-language surnames